Angels with Angles is a 2005 American comedy film directed by and starring Scott Edmund Lane.

Cast
Julie Carmen as Graciella
Frank Gorshin as George Burns / Shelleen
Rodney Dangerfield as God
Scott Edmund Lane as Shoomie
David Proval as Howie Gold
Branscombe Richmond as El Capitan
Henry Darrow as Raul
Adam West as Alfred the Butler
Jerry Mathers as Tobacconist #1
Soupy Sales as Tobacconist #2
Richard Moll as Robert the Bartender
Frank Stallone as Elvis Presley
Zelda Rubinstein as Zelda, God's Assistant
Carmen Argenziano as Rico
Jeffrey Weissman as Groucho

Reception
The film has a 0% rating on Rotten Tomatoes from five critics.

References

External links
 
 

American comedy films
2005 comedy films
2005 films
2000s English-language films
2000s American films